Romans 15 is the fifteenth chapter of the Epistle to the Romans in the New Testament of the Christian Bible. It is authored by Paul the Apostle, while he was in Corinth in the mid-50s AD, with the help of an amanuensis (secretary), Tertius, who adds his own greeting in Romans 16:22.

Text

The original text was written in Koine Greek.

Textual witnesses
Some early manuscripts containing the text of this chapter are:
In Greek:
Papyrus 118 (3rd century; extant verses 26–27, 32–33)
Codex Vaticanus (AD 325–350)
Codex Sinaiticus (330–360)
Codex Alexandrinus (400–440)
Codex Ephraemi Rescriptus (~450; complete)
In Gothic language
Codex Carolinus (6th/7th century; extant verses 3–13)
In Latin
Codex Carolinus (6th/7th century; extant verses 3–13)

Old Testament references 
 Romans 15:3 references Psalm 69:9
 Romans 15:9 references 2 Samuel 22:50 and Psalm 18:49
 Romans 15:10 references Deuteronomy 32:43
 Romans 15:11 references Psalm 117:1
 Romans 15:12 references Isaiah 11:10
 Romans 15:21 references Isaiah 52:15

New Testament references
 Romans 15:4 references 2 Timothy 3:16

Theme
According to Lutheran theologian Harold Buls, chapter 15 continues the theme of the weak and strong which Paul had addressed in chapter 14, but the application is now wider than to adiaphora (things neither commanded nor forbidden). Buls observes that:

Verses 22 to 29 relate to Paul's plans to visit the Christian community in Rome.

The scriptures

Verse 3
In verse 3, Paul quotes from the Septuagint translation of Psalm 69:

He then continues, in order to establish that Christian liberty should be lived out in the service of others and with forbearance towards the weak:

Theologian William Robertson Nicoll states that "everything that was written before" refers to "the whole Old Testament". Lutheran theologian Johann Arndt paraphrases this verse as:

Anglican Bishop Handley Moule, writing in the Cambridge Bible for Schools and Colleges (1891), suggests that Paul develops here "a great principle, namely, that the Old Testament was throughout designed for the instruction and establishment of New Testament believers". The author of 2 Timothy elaborates a similar point in 2 Timothy 3:15–16:

The gentiles

Verse 9

In verse 8, Paul refers to Jesus Christ as having become the servant of the circumcision (i.e. servant of the Abrahamic covenant: in  but also translated as 'minister of the circumcised' or 'servant of the Jews'), and then finds and quotes four extracts from the Old Testament which refer to the gentiles: 2 Samuel 22:50 (referenced in Psalm 18:49); Deuteronomy 32:43; Psalm 117:1 and Isaiah 11:10. Theologian Albert Barnes says that Jesus "exercised his office – the office of the Messiah – among the Jews, or with respect to the Jews[...] He was born a Jew; was circumcised; came "to" that nation; and died in their midst, without having gone himself to any other people", but with three objectives in mind:
for the truth of God
to confirm the promises made to the fathers
and that the Gentiles[...] might [also] glorify God.

Verse 12

The text of verse 12 is taken from Isaiah 11:10.

Illyricum
In verse 19, Paul refers to the Roman province of Illyricum as the easternmost point of his missionary travels so far, Paul having "fully preached" the gospel from Jerusalem to this point. Illyricum stretched along the eastern coast of the Adriatic, and formed the northern boundary of Epirus and the north-western boundary of Macedonia. According to Acts 20:1–2, he "went away to go to Macedonia, and having passed through those parts[...] he came to Greece"; Anglican Bishop Charles Ellicott argues that "the vague expression which we find in Acts 20:2, When he had gone over those parts", affords ample room for the circuit in question.

"Fully preached" in relation to the gospel is generally understood to refer to the geographical reach of its preaching: the Jubilee Bible 2000 has "I have filled the entire area with the gospel of the Christ", and Moule suggests that "a fair paraphrase would thus be I have carried the Gospel everywhere".

See also
 Achaia
 Illyricum
 Jerusalem
 Jesus Christ
 Judea
 Macedonia
 Spain
 Related Bible parts: Deuteronomy 32, 2 Samuel 22, Psalm 18, Psalm 69, Psalm 117, Isaiah 11, Isaiah 52, Matthew 5, Acts 20

References

Bibliography

External links 
 King James Bible - Wikisource
English Translation with Parallel Latin Vulgate
Online Bible at GospelHall.org (ESV, KJV, Darby, American Standard Version, Bible in Basic English)
Multiple bible versions at Bible Gateway (NKJV, NIV, NRSV etc.)

 
15